The Faculty of Engineering of UMons (French: Faculté Polytechnique de Mons (FPMs)) is a faculty of engineering at the University of Mons in the Wallonia region in Belgium.

Before the 2009 merger of the Faculté Polytechnique de Mons and the University of Mons-Hainaut, the FPMs was the oldest university of the city of Mons and the first civil Engineering school in Belgium (1836). Its first name was École des Mines (Mining School). It is a member of the Top Industrial Managers for Europe (TIME) network, an association of 50 leading engineering schools and faculties in Europe. On January 1, 2009, the Engineering Faculty of Mons and the University of Mons-Hainaut merged into a new university called the University of Mons (UMons).

The Faculty organizes a five-year course and delivers the Engineering (Ir.) and Master of Science (MSc.) degree. An Applied Sciences Doctoral degree (Dr.) is also available at the FPMs.

Teaching
As of 2005 there were 1200 students at the faculty, with 170 diplomas issued per year. Diplomas offered at the faculty include:
BSc. in engineering
MSc. in engineering (Architecture, Chemistry, Electricity, Computer and Management, Mechanics, Mining and Geology).
Dr. in Applied Sciences

Research
Research teams at the faculty work in 25 laboratories over four research centres: Multitel, Materia Nova, Inisma, and CETIC.

International partnerships

The faculty has 50 Erasmus partners, and 25 direct partnerships with foreign universities. It is a member of the TIME network, and offers double degrees with institutes including:
 Technische Universität Wien
 Ecole Centrale de Lille
 Ecole Centrale de Lyon
 Ecole Centrale de Marseille
 Ecole Centrale de Nantes
 École nationale supérieure de l'aéronautique et de l'espace
 École supérieure d'électricité
 Politecnico di Milano
 Universidad Politécnica de Madrid

Notes and references

See also
 Science and technology in Wallonia
 University Foundation
 Initialis Science Park
 Science Parks of Wallonia

External links
 Official web site
 TCTS Lab, FPMs

Defunct universities and colleges in Belgium
University of Mons
Educational institutions established in 1837
1837 establishments in Belgium
Engineering universities and colleges in Belgium